Ironstone Creek is an  tributary of the Manatawny Creek in Berks County, Pennsylvania in the United States.

Ironstone Creek joins the Manatawny at Pine Forge.

See also
List of rivers of Pennsylvania

References

Rivers of Berks County, Pennsylvania
Rivers of Pennsylvania
Tributaries of the Schuylkill River